The Anabar Plateau is a mountain plateau in Krasnoyarsk Krai and the Sakha Republic (Yakutia), Siberia, Russia. 

The plateau is in a latitude dominated by permafrost. The permafrost thickness under the Anabar Plateau reaches .

Geography  
The Anabar Plateau is located north of the Arctic Circle in northeastern Krasnoyarsk Krai and northwestern Sakha Republic, SSE of the Taymyr Depression, the central part of the North Siberian Lowland. It is located north of the Vilyuy Plateau and is the northernmost feature of the Central Siberian Plateau, to which it is connected in the southeast. To the southwest it runs into the higher Putorana Mountains, the border between both not being well-defined. There are slightly higher tableland type elevations running across the plateau area, mostly in a roughly east to west direction.

The Big Kuonamka, which forms the upper course of the Anabar River, has its source in the plateau and flows in a northeastern direction. Rivers cut deep valleys or canyons, often flanked by scenic cliffs formed by very ancient eroded sediments. The Popigay River has its source in the northeastern sector of the plateau. River Kotuy cuts from the south across the western side and is joined by its tributary Kotuykan from the highest part of the Anabar Plateau. Also to the southeast of the plateau is the source of the Olenyok, which flows east and then northeastwards. Rivers Kengeede and Kyuyonelekeen of the Olenyok basin have their sources at the southern end. To the northwest flows the Khatanga River and to the northeast the Malaya Kuonamka of the Anabar basin. To the east lies the wider basin of the Lena. The Popigai impact structure is located to the NNE of the plateau.

Geology
The Anabar Plateau of the Central Siberian Plateau is one of the oldest structures on Earth, with rocks that are more than 3 billion years old. In its central region it is composed of Archean crystalline schists and gneisses. Along the periphery of the plateau Proterozoic and Lower Paleozoic limestones predominate.

Anabar Shield
The Anabar Plateau coincides geographically with the Anabar Shield, a geological region that is an exposed basement of the Siberian Craton. Together with the Aldan Shield further to the southeast, the Anabar Shield is one of the main features of the craton.

Flora and climate

Precipitation falls in the summer, mostly in the form of rain.

References

External links

Anabar Information and history
Fishing helicopter flight from Khatanga to Kotuykan river
Central Siberian Plateau
Landforms of Krasnoyarsk Krai
Plateaus of the Sakha Republic